The Huntington Building (also known as the Consolidated Bank Building) is a historic site in Miami, Florida. It is located at 168 Southeast 1st Street. On January 4, 1989, it was added to the U.S. National Register of Historic Places.

References

External links

 
 
 
 Dade County listings at National Register of Historic Places
 Florida's Office of Cultural and Historical Programs
 Dade County listings
 Consolidated Bank Building

Buildings and structures in Miami
National Register of Historic Places in Miami